Romualdas Krikščiūnas (18 June 1930 in Kaunas, Lithuania – 2 November 2010) was the apostolic administrator of the Roman Catholic Diocese of Panevėžys, Lithuania. He was ordained in 1954 and became bishop in 1966.

References

1930 births
2010 deaths
Lithuanian Roman Catholic bishops